The 1934 Minnesota gubernatorial election took place on November 6, 1934. Farmer–Labor Party candidate Floyd B. Olson defeated Republican Party of Minnesota challenger Martin A. Nelson.

Results

See also
 List of Minnesota gubernatorial elections

External links
 http://www.sos.state.mn.us/home/index.asp?page=653
 http://www.sos.state.mn.us/home/index.asp?page=657

Minnesota
Gubernatorial
1934
November 1934 events